Lombardi is an Italian surname, often held by the descendants of migrants from Lombardy and Northern Italy.
 Alberto Lombardi (1893–1975), Italian Olympic equestrian
 Alessia Lombardi (born 1976), Italian former professional tennis player
 Alessandro Lombardi (born 2000), Italian footballer
 Armando Lombardi (1905–1964), archbishop and Vatican diplomat
 Casimir Lombardi (1901–1974), French racing cyclist
 Daniele Lombardi (1946–2018), composer, pianist and visual artist
 Dean Lombardi (born 1958), president and general manager of the NHL's Los Angeles Kings
 Ernie Lombardi (1908–1977), Major League Baseball player
 Federica Lombardi (born 1989), Italian operatic soprano
 Federico Lombardi S.J. (born 1942), director of the Holy See Press Office
 Filippo Lombardi (born 1956), Swiss politician
 Filippo Lombardi (born 1990), Italian goalkeeper
 Gennaro Lombardi Italian Pizza pioneer
 Gianfranco Lombardi (1941–2021), Italian Olympic basketball player
 Giannina Arangi-Lombardi (1891–1951), Italian opera soprano
 Giovanni Lombardi (cyclist) (born 1969), Italian road bicycling racer
 Guido Lombardi (born 1949), Peruvian journalist, lawyer, and politician
 Gustavo Lombardi (born 1975), Argentine retired professional footballer 
 Joe Lombardi (born 1971), American football coach and former college player 
 John V. Lombardi (born 1942), American professor, Latin American historian and university administrator
 Johnny Lombardi (1915–2002), pioneer of multicultural broadcasting in Canada
 Julian Lombardi (born 1956), American inventor, author, educator, and computer scientist
 Lella Lombardi (1941–1992), Italian female race car driver
 Linda Lombardi (born 1961), American writer and linguist
 Louis Lombardi (born 1968), American actor
 Luca Lombardi (composer) (born 1945), Italian composer
 Luca Lombardi (footballer) (born 2002), Italian footballer
 Mark Lombardi (1955–2000), abstract painter known for his network diagrams of crime and conspiracy
 Matthew Lombardi (born 1982), National Hockey League player
 Michael Lombardi (disambiguation)
 Pietro Lombardi (disambiguation)
Pietro Lombardi (architect) (1894–1984), Italian architect
Pietro Lombardi (wrestler) (1922–2011), Italian wrestler
Pietro Lombardi (singer) (born 1992), German singer
 Rodolfo Lombardi (1908–1985), Italian cinematographer
 Sandro Lombardi, Swiss footballer
 Steve Lombardi (born 1961), professional wrestler better known as the Brooklyn Brawler
 Vic Lombardi (1922–1997), American Major League Baseball pitcher
 Vince Lombardi (1913–1970), American football coach, or either of the two awards named for him:
 Vince Lombardi Trophy: awarded to the winning team of the Super Bowl
 Rotary Lombardi Award: annual award given to the best college football lineman or linebacker

Fictional people by the name Lombardi
 Tina Lombardi, a character played by Marion Cotillard in the 2004 film A Very Long Engagement
 Falco Lombardi, fictional character from Nintendo's Star Fox series of video games

Other:
 Lombardi's, the first pizzeria in the United States (opened in 1905)

See also
Lombardi (disambiguation)
Lombardo
Lombards
Longobardi (disambiguation)
Lombard (disambiguation)

Italian-language surnames
Italian toponymic surnames
Ethnonymic surnames
de:Lombardi
es:Lombardi
fr:Lombardi
it:Lombardi#Biografie
ja:ロンバルディ
pt:Lombardi
ru:Ломбарди